
Boston University College of Communication (COM) is the communication school of Boston University, a private research university in Boston, Massachusetts. It was founded in 1947 as the School of Public Relations. The College of Communication is the oldest public relations school in the United States. Today, the school offers undergraduate and graduate degrees in three academic departments: Film and Television;  Journalism; and Mass Communication (Advertising, Public Relations, Communication Studies, and Emerging Media Studies). The school's journalism and communication programs are highly ranked nationally with its film program ranked 11th by The Hollywood Reporter in 2013. The College of Communication building is near Kenmore Square and Fenway Park.

The College of Communication is home to many of Boston University's most popular student-run organizations, including butv10 (television), WTBU Radio, AdLab, and PRLab. COM also offers special internship programs in Los Angeles, Washington D.C., and London.

Each summer, the school hosts the Academy of Media Production, a four-week program for high-school students, and the Pre-College Summer Journalism Institute, sponsored by the New England Center for Investigative Reporting.

References

External links

 Official website

Educational institutions established in 1947
Communication, College of
1947 establishments in Massachusetts
Film schools in the United States

Shorty Award winners